Koçhisar can refer to:

 Koçhisar, Alaca
 Koçhisar, Sandıklı
 Koçhisar Dam
 Battle of Koçhisar